The 1988 Scottish Cup Final was played between Celtic and Dundee United at Hampden Park on 14 May 1988. Celtic had reached the final after coming from behind to defeat Hearts 2-1 in the semi-final, while Dundee United had defeated Aberdeen 1-0 in their semi-final after two replays. 

Celtic won 2–1, with Frank McAvennie scoring both of their goals. They had been 1-0 down after  Kevin Gallacher put Dundee United ahead, only for McAvennie to score a late equaliser and then a winner with a low right foot shot at the back post after a corner to complete the double for Celtic, who were already Premier Division champions.

The guest of honour was British prime minister Margaret Thatcher, greeted by supporters of both teams by a wave of red cards. As she took her seat, thousands of supporters of both teams sang "you can stick your poll tax up your arse".

Match

Report
After a goalless first half, Kevin Gallacher opened the scoring for Dundee United a few minutes after halftime. Gallacher outpaced Celtic's Roy Aitken to a ball which had been headed forward by Eamonn Bannon and shot passed Celtic's goalkeeper Allen McKnight, who was in the team due to an injury to Celtic's regular goalie Packie Bonner. Shortly afterwards United failed to take the opportunity to increase their lead when Bannon missed two good opportunities. This proved costly when Frank McAvennie equalised for Celtic. McAvennie then scored the winner with 50 seconds of play remaining.

The defeat meant that United had now lost all five Scottish Cup finals that they had played in. The scoreline and pattern of the match was noted by reporter Jim Traynor for being similar to the 1985 final when Celtic had also defeated United. Traynor suggested that for Dundee United the 1988 final was like a 're-run of a bad movie'.

Details

References

1988
Cup Final
Scottish Cup Final 1988
Scottish Cup Final 1988
20th century in Glasgow